Cyclaxyra politula is a species of cucujoid beetle in the family Cyclaxyridae. It is endemic to New Zealand, found on the North Island, South Island, and Stewart Island.

References

Cucujoidea
Beetles described in 1881
Taxa named by Thomas Broun